Mangammal chatram is a  chatram located at Kodumbalur in Pudukkottai district, Tamilnadu, India.

Location
Known as Kodumbalur chatram it is located in Viralimalai-Madurai road.

Structure
This chatram was built by Mangammal, in 17th century CE, for the use of the people who are going from Madurai to Trichy and vice versa, for taking rest, boarding and lodging. It has many art works. As found in palaces, beautiful pillars with arches are found in this structure. It exposes the architectural skill of the artisans of that period.

Present status
Later it was changed into an educational institution. For some years middle school was functioning in it. As new school was built nearby, the school was shifted there and it was locked and not used. It was not maintained properly. Historical enthusiasts expect that this should be properly maintained.

References

External links
 நம்ம ஊரு சுற்றுலாத்தளங்கள், கொடும்பாளூர், ஈகரை தமிழ்க்களஞ்சியம், 19 அக்டோபர் 2011
 கொடும்பாளூர் அற்புதங்கள், தகவல், 21 சனவரி 2014

Living arrangements
Architecture in India
Pudukkottai district
Chatrams in Tamil Nadu